Chinthana Geetal Vidanage (born December 31, 1981) is a Sri Lankan weightlifter. He won a gold medal in the men's 62 kg category weightlifting; the first weightlifting gold medal for Sri Lanka in the 2006 Commonwealth Games held in Australia. In, 2011 Vidanage was banned for four years for violating anti-doping rules.

He was born in Polonnaruwa. Vidanage was a student of Polonnaruwa Royal Central College.

Vidanage has qualified to compete for Sri Lanka at the 2022 Commonwealth Games in Birmingham, England.

Drugs
A urine sample provided by Vidanage in April 2011 at the 2011 Asian Weightlifting Championships in China was found to have metabolites of two methylhexanamine, which is banned by the World Anti-Doping Agency. Vidanage admitted taking the drug "unknowingly". The International Weightlifting Federation subsequently banned him for four years.

See also
 List of Sri Lankans by sport

References

External links
 
 

1981 births
Living people
People from North Central Province, Sri Lanka
Sri Lankan male weightlifters
Weightlifters at the 2008 Summer Olympics
Olympic weightlifters of Sri Lanka
Commonwealth Games gold medallists for Sri Lanka
Weightlifters at the 2006 Commonwealth Games
Weightlifters at the 2010 Commonwealth Games
Sri Lankan sportspeople in doping cases
Doping cases in weightlifting
Commonwealth Games silver medallists for Sri Lanka
Weightlifters at the 2014 Asian Games
Commonwealth Games medallists in weightlifting
Weightlifters at the 2014 Commonwealth Games
Weightlifters at the 2018 Commonwealth Games
Asian Games competitors for Sri Lanka
Sri Lankan powerlifters
Medallists at the 2006 Commonwealth Games
Medallists at the 2010 Commonwealth Games